Kamila Witkowska  (born 2 December 1991) is a Polish volleyball player. She is part of the Poland women's national volleyball team.

She participated in the 2019 Montreux Volley Masters, and 2019 FIVB Volleyball Women's Nations League. On club level she played for KS Developres Rzeszów.

References 

1991 births
Living people
Polish women's volleyball players